Gulal or abir or abhir is the traditional name given to the coloured powders used for some Hindu rituals, in particular for the Holi festival or Dol Purnima (though commonly associated with the red colour used in the festival). During Holi, which celebrates love and equality, people throw these powder solutions at each other while singing and dancing.

Legend

A legend narrates that Lord Krishna complained to his mother about the darkness of his skin compared to that of his consort Radha. As a result, Krishna's mother smeared colours on Radha's face. This explains why today Holi is celebrated by throwing colours on people.

Composition

From natural to chemical
In earlier times, Gulal powders were prepared from flowers coming from trees, such as the Indian coral tree and the flame of the forest, that had medicinal properties, beneficial to the skin. After the advent of synthetic dyes in the middle of 19th century, the disappearance of trees in urban areas and the pursuit of higher profits led to the abandonment of natural colours.

The new industrial dyes have been manufactured through chemical processes with non-standard parameters and hence the resulting colours are sometimes toxic for face and skin, causing problems such as eye irritation, allergies, skin infection and asthma. Unsafe products have often been sold on the road by small traders, in boxes with labels saying "for industrial use only".

Recent production from natural sources

Recently, the various harmful effects and concerns for the environment (synthetic powders caused temporary wastewater pollution, too) generated awareness and encouraged people to celebrate an eco-friendly Holi. For the preparation of Herbal Gulal, a variety of safe dyes can be used, such as turmeric (Curcuma longa), Indigo (Indigofera) or annatto (Bixa orellana), which are all ingredients easily available on the market at moderate prices.

In the new natural processes to make Herbal Gulal, no salts of any heavy metal have been used and the combination of ingredients provides a powder having soft and supple touch with good sticking capacities to skin. The production profile of dry colour composition is eco-friendly as no toxic ingredients are released under the preparation. In this way, it has been possible to replace synthetic colours with natural ones. Herbal Gulal can be manufactured at higher scale and people who were concerned about synthetic powders can now enjoy rituals without restrictions.

Uses

Religious and cultural uses
Gulal powder has always had an important role in Hindu culture and has always been used for religious purposes. 
Besides Holi festival, the use of coloured powders appears in other ceremonies, such as funerals. In this case, in some populations, a particular ritual occurs when the deceased is a married man. The widow puts on all the ornaments she possesses and takes leave of her husband adorning him with all her jewels. Holding a small brass plate with colored powders, she lets the men participating in the ceremony paint the face of the deceased. This ritual is associated with the one of marriage, in which the bridegroom and the bride anoint themselves with coloured powders for four days before the wedding. This ointment, indeed, is meant to prepare their bodies for conjugal life. Beyond the religious sphere, the consumption of Gulal powder is spread for different uses.

Scientific uses
One interesting use of this powder has been developed in the field of latent fingerprints. A study by Punjabi University of Patiala shows that the application of Gulal or food colours to latent fingerprints can give clear results.  During this study, a few grams of dry colours were taken and sprinkled over different surfaces, such as normal paper, on top of CDs, over aluminium foil and aluminium sheets. It was concluded that commonly and easily available agents are a useful substitute for the decipherment of latent prints.

Curiosities
Indian manufacturers of Holi colours are facing huge losses as Chinese alternatives are selling a lot. A survey reported that Chinese products are more innovative and cheaper by up to 55%, comparing to powders manufactured locally in regions like Uttar Pradesh, Rajasthan, Madhya Pradesh and Gujarat. The invasion of innovative and fancy Chinese products, despite the central government effort to promote ‘Made in India’, is making survival difficult for small manufacturers, most of whom have been engaged in this business for decades .

Coldplay's video ‘Hymn for the weekend’ was filmed in Mumbai during the Holi festival, using Gulal powder as a central feature.

See also
Krishna
The Color Run

References

Hindu festivals
Holi
Powders